School № 1535 is a secondary school for students of years 7-11 in the Khamovniki District of Moscow, Russia.

History

Pre-lyceum period 
The school building was built in 1929 according to the project by architect M.Motylev.

Since 1930, the school was called Frunzensky District Secondary School №2 named after K.E.Voroshilov.

In 1937, the school was renamed into Secondary School № 23 named after K.E.Voroshilov with a Voroshilov monument installed in the school yard.

The school building hosted military hospital during the WW-II.

Since 1956, old school building hosted Secondary Boarding School № 14 with classes with Chinese language specialization. Students also learned hindi and urdu for some time. Japanese, Korean, and Arabian languages have been made available for certain classes at a later stage. Oriental languages have been studied in addition to English, German, or French.

Lyceum 
In 1991, experimental Lyceum with oriental specialization was opened in cooperation with Institute of Asian and African Studies (IAAS) at Moscow State University. The Lyceum initially had 350 students.

In 2004-2005, the school has been closed for renovation with two new buildings being added to the complex. Architects Yu.B. Grechukhina and I.M.Romanenko from OOO "Project Institute № 2" designed the project.

After merger with the School № 35  of I.M. Sechenov First Moscow State Medical University (Sechenov University) (since 2010 – Sechenov Lyceum within Lyceum № 1535). The number of students reached 900.

In the 2016—2017 school year the Lyceum had 1200 students.

In August 2017, all Moscow gymnasiums and Lyceums have been formally transferred to Schools, hence the renaming to current name – School № 1535.

Management 
Directors:

 1936 — I.P. Kazantsev, director of Secondary School № 2 named after K.E.Voroshilov.
 1948 — Schepakin, director of Secondary School № 23 named after K.E.Voroshilov 1956 — Utenkov, Petr Arkadievich, director of Boarding School № 14.
 1991 — Mokrinsky, Mikhail Gennadievich. Head of Education Department of Central District of Moscow since 2012. Since 2016, in the Letovo School. 
 2012 — Vorobyova, Tatiana Vasilievna, former director of Boarding School № 14.
 2017 — Sekhin, Sergey Sergeevich, former director of School № 1210 of North-West District of Moscow.

Modern school 
Admission is based on entrance exams. Average class is about 30 students. Studying process is organized in five-day weeks.

Students of Years 7-9 specialize in the following areas:

 mathematics
 humanitarian
 bio-medical

Students of Years 10-11 choose one of the following specializations:

 social-humanitarian (with emphasis on history)
 social-humanitarian (with emphasis on mathematics)
 history & philology 
 economics & mathematics
 physics & mathematics
 IT & technology
 biology & medicine (including Latin language)
 medicine and mathematics (on top of Russian, chemistry, and biology there is additional focus on mathematics)
 psychology
 socio-psychology

Socio-psychology, psychology, and bio-medical specializations are located in a separate building at Maly Savvinsky per. 8.

In school rankings 
 2006 — in the Moscow secondary schools ranking of Izvestia newspaper, the Lyceum got tied in 7th/8th place with Moscow Lyceum №1525 Vorobyevy Gory; the Lyceum №1525 was ranked firstamong schools for teaching French language and second for teaching English.
 2008 — included by «Big City» magazine in the list of the “Most interesting schools in Moscow».
 2010 — ranked 6th in Moscow for overall results in schools subjects’ Olympiads, and 4th for results of Unified State Examination (USE).
 2011 — ranked 1st in Top-10 Best Schools in Moscow by Moscow city administration based on USE and Olympiads results, and ranked 1st in Best Secondary Schools in Economics by Moscow State University based on Open Schools Championship in Economics in 2011. Next year Lyceum №1535 again took the lead in the top Moscow schools ranking by the Moscow city Department of Education and remained undisputed leader of the Moscow ranking by 2016.
 2013 — ranked 1st (tie with the Moscow Center for Continuous Mathematical Education) in top-500 Best Schools in Russia based on overall results of USE and all-Russian and international Olympiads.
 2017 — ranked 2d among schools providing consistently high standards of quality education in Moscow (awarded first-level grant from mayor of Moscow on school development). 29 students reached absolute maximum of 100 points on their USE tests, 58 students finished the school with honors and were awarded the medal “For Distinguished Achievements in Education”. 36 students became the winners of All-Russian Olympiads in economics, social science, history, law, literature, Russian, French, and English languages, biology and arts.
 2017 — ranked 4th in Top-500 Best Secondary Schools in Russia
 2018 — ranked 1st in Top-400 Best Moscow Schools for contribution in quality education for 2017/2018 school year by Moscow Department of Education.

References 

Khamovniki District
Schools in Moscow
Educational institutions established in 1991
1991 establishments in Russia